Good Morning, Miss Bliss (also retroactively known as Saved by the Bell: The Junior High Years) is an American teen sitcom that aired on the Disney Channel from 1988 to 1989 (and later in syndication as part of the Saved by the Bell rerun package), starring Hayley Mills as a teacher at John F. Kennedy Junior High School in Indianapolis, Indiana. After one season on the air on the Disney Channel, the show was retooled as Saved by the Bell, which aired on NBC.

The show was the first program produced by a Big Three network for cable television – in this case, NBC produced it for the Disney Channel.

Plot
The series focuses on the life of junior high school teacher Miss Carrie Bliss (Hayley Mills) at John F. Kennedy Junior High in Indianapolis. She is often put into morally difficult situations by her work and often serves as the only person her students could turn to. Her eighth grade students include:

Zack Morris (Mark-Paul Gosselaar), a charming, manipulative scamp. He is lazy, a bad student and always looking for the easy way out. Nonetheless, in the episode "Parents and Teachers", Miss Bliss says that Zack has the most potential of all her students.

Lisa Turtle (Lark Voorhies), a rich shopaholic; and best friend of Nikki. Lisa is the crush of many guys in the school and in Miss Bliss's class, especially Screech.

Samuel "Screech" Powers (Dustin Diamond), an awkward nerd with a crush on Lisa, but an excellent student and very honest.

Mikey Gonzalez (Max Battimo), Zack's best friend, who, although not generally as awkward as Screech, becomes quite shy around girls; a good student, especially in math and history but sometimes gets into conflict with Zack.
 
Nikki Coleman (Heather Hopper), who is outspoken and often advocates for the moral course of action when the others decide to misbehave.

The show also features Mylo Williams (T.K. Carter), a maintenance supervisor, and Miss Tina Paladrino (Joan Ryan), a quirky teacher and friend of Miss Bliss, with whom she often discusses her personal life, with Miss Paladrino acting as sounding board. Dennis Haskins plays the school principal, Mr. Richard Belding.

The show was cancelled after 13 episodes, and NBC reclaimed the rights to it, reformatting Good Morning, Miss Bliss into Saved by the Bell; the characters of Zack, Lisa, Screech and Mr. Belding made the transition to Saved by the Bell, which instead saw the four located in the fictional California suburb of Bayside.

The series was then integrated into the Saved by the Bell syndicated rerun package, with Miss Bliss episodes being introduced with a cold open by Mark-Paul Gosselaar (in character as Zack Morris) explaining that they were from an earlier time frame than the rest of the series, followed by a retrofitted version of the regular Saved by the Bell opening sequence.

Cast
Hayley Mills as Miss Carrie Bliss
Dennis Haskins as Mr. Richard Belding
Joan Ryan as Miss Tina Paladrino
Mark-Paul Gosselaar as Zachary "Zack" Morris
Max Battimo as Michael "Mikey" Gonzalez
Dustin Diamond as Samuel "Screech" Powers
Heather Hopper as Nicole "Nikki" Coleman
Lark Voorhies as Lisa Turtle
T. K. Carter as Mylo Williams

Episodes

Broadcast

Original pilot
The original pilot for Good Morning, Miss Bliss aired on July 11, 1987, on NBC (in The Facts of Life'''s timeslot). Hayley Mills would be the only actress to carry over from the pilot to the series. Brian Austin Green as Adam Montcrief, Jaleel White as Bobby Wilson, and Jonathan Brandis as Michael Thompson were among some of the actors to appear in the pilot. Green was, in essence, the "lead" student in the pilot, a particularly serious student, who wore business suits.

Several other characters from the series existed in the pilot but were played by different actors; Mr. Gerald Belding was played by Oliver Clark, and Miss Tina Paladrino was played by Maria O'Brien. Other characters include Gabriel Damon as Bradley; Samantha Mills as Wendy; Julie Ronnie as Lonnie Maple; Matt Shakman as Georgie Winslow; Charles Siebert as Charlie Davis; Britton Elliott as Janet Hillhurst; Josh Goddard as Steven; and Andrea Messersmith as Laurie.

Syndication
After the huge success of Saved by the Bell, episodes of this series were added to the syndication package. Intros by Mark-Paul Gosselaar, in character as Zack Morris, were added to the beginning of each episode, and the title sequence was remade in the style of Saved by the Bell. The series reran on TBS, along with its spinoff. Good Morning Miss Bliss and Saved by the Bell were later aired on The N from late 2008 to July 2009. As of February 2015, Netflix syndication of Saved by the Bell also reflects this change.

Although the Saved By the Bell intro was modified to accommodate the Miss Bliss cast, it was incompletely customized for those episodes. The reflection in the animated sunglasses shows images of Bayside High and The Max, locations that were not present in the Indiana-set Good Morning, Miss Bliss.

Home media
The complete series of Good Morning, Miss Bliss was released by Shout Factory with the Saved By The Bell'': The Complete Collection DVD set on October 2, 2018.

References

External links

 

1988 American television series debuts
1989 American television series endings
1980s American school television series
1980s American teen sitcoms
Disney Channel original programming
English-language television shows
Middle school television series
Saved by the Bell
Television series by Universal Television
Television shows set in Indianapolis